Antoine Salamin (born 19 December 1945) is an architect and Swiss former racing driver.

Racing career 

Champion of Switzerland in 1985, he participates in the World Sportscar Championship as a driver and with his own team from 1977 to 1979 and from 1988 to 1991.

With four participations in the 24 Hours of Le Mans, seventh place in 1988 and eighth in 1991 in the World Sportscar Championship for teams, Antoine Salamin confirms his international stature..

In addition to regular rankings in the European Interserie Cup and the German Supercup Championship (podiums), the 1988 season is punctuated by its seventh place in the Porsche World Cup.

An eclectic driver, he is also involved in rally (Rallye du Vin, du Haut-Valais, Lyon-Charbonnières) on Ford Escort RS 2000, Opel and Porsche, in rally-raid (Paris-Dakar 1982 where he is seventh overall before his retirement at Gao) on Toyota Hilux, Antoine Salamin was distinguished above all by his loyalty to Porsche.

He has notably driven the following cars: Porsche Carrera 2.7 RS, Porsche Carrera 3.0 RS, Porsche Turbo 930, Porsche 934, Porsche 935, Porsche 962C and Porsche 997 GT3 RS (1st of the Porsche Swiss Cup in circuit ranking in 2011). In 1987, he has driven a Sauber Sehcar C6 with a Ford Cosworth engine and in 1983 he participated in the 3 hours of Hockenheim in "Sport 2000".

His racing driver career began in 1973 and ended in 1998 with Hockenheim's 3 hours victory..

He created the Swiss Team Salamin, independent structure, becoming for the 1991 season, Team Salamin Primagaz. Driver and sporting director, he officiated at this last post in Ferrari Challenge in the mid-1990s and in some events in 1998 (in FIA GT Championship).

Race tracks in Switzerland 
As an architect, he designs three projects of race tracks in Switzerland.

In 1985, the Swiss Grand Prix was reborn in Sion (it missed only one vote at the Federal Council to authorize this punctual race on a temporary track located on the Airport of Sion).

A project of a permanent alpine track, in 1996, on the airfield of Rarogne failed during the popular vote of the commune which followed.

Finally, at the dawn of the year 2000, the project of Alternative Technological Center, intended to promote and experiment new automotive technologies, to Chamoson seemed to bring together all the qualities. The population of the municipality voted in 2004 in favor of the project, for the first time in Switzerland, to 75% of the votes.

Racing record

24 Hours of Le Mans results

World Sportscar Championship results

European Interserie Cup results

Super Cup results

Other international events

Awards 

 Champion of Switzerland in 1985 (Porsche 935)
 Vice-Champion of Switzerland in 1981 and 1984; 2nd of Interswiss in 1986 (Porsche 935)
 18th of the World Porsche-Cup classification in 1985 (Porsche 935)
 7th of the World Porsche-Cup classification in 1988 (Porsche 962C)

References

1945 births
Living people
Swiss racing drivers
24 Hours of Le Mans drivers
World Sportscar Championship drivers
Sports car racing team owners